Gabrielle Rifkind is a British mediator who has specialised in international conflict resolution working through non-governmental organisations, (NGOs) in the Middle East and United Kingdom. She is the Director of Oxford Process. She is known as a commentator on international peacemaking and related themes and author of several titles. Her work considers the role of human relationships in managing parties with "radical disagreements" with the goal of establishing areas of potential mutual self-interest.

Early life 
Rifkind is a graduate of Manchester University and Edinburgh University. After working for the Probation Service, she trained at the Institute of Group Analysis and became a group analyst and a psychotherapist.

Later career 
Rifkind joined the Oxford Research Group in the late 1990s to explore peacemaking in the Israeli–Palestinian conflict. She became head of the Israel/Palestine programme. She next turned her attention to Iran and the wider Middle East.

In 2016 she founded Oxford Process, which works in conflict situations to build relationships with conflicted parties to identify opportunities to reduce tensions or prevent further escalation of violence.

Rifkind has frequently appeared on broadcast media in the UK has given public lectures on peacemaking and contributed to a colloquium at Princeton University and has twice debated at the Oxford Union.  She has been one of the conflict mediators for four series of BBC Radio 4's "Across the Red Line" presented by British political journalist, Anne McElvoy.

She is the co-author, with peace activist Scilla Elworthy of Making Terrorism History (2005) and, with former senior UN diplomat Giandomenico Picco, of The Fog of Peace: The Human Face of Conflict Resolution, and author of The Psychology of Political Extremism: What would Sigmund Freud have thought about Islamic State.

Publications

Books
 Co-author with Tessa Dalley and Kim Terry. Three Voices of Art Therapy: Image, Client, Therapist. United Kingdom: Routledge, 1993 and 2014. 
 Co-author with Scilla Elworthy. Hearts and Minds: Human Security Approaches to Political Violence. United Kingdom: Demos, 2005. 
 Co-author with Scilla Elworthy. Making Terrorism History. London: Penguin/Random House, 2006. 
 Co-Author with Giandomenico Picco. The Fog of Peace: How to Prevent War, Bloomsbury/I.B. Tauris, 2017. 
 The Psychology of Political Extremism: What would Sigmund Freud have thought about Islamic State, 2018. 
 Contributor, "When Empathy Fails: Managing Radical Differences" in Encounters: The Art of Interfaith Dialogue 2018.

Articles
Her contributions to journals include:
 
 
 
 
 
  
 
 
 
 
     
 
 
 
 
 
 Let's try to understand North Korea's actions: it sees the world as its enemy, The Guardian, July 2017.
 Gaza regeneration: we all need dreams for the future, OpenDemocracy, June 2018.
 National Dialogue: Post-Brexit, We Need a UK-Wide Coming Together, OpenDemocracy, January 2019.
 
 "Preparing the Psychological Space for Peacemaking", with Nita Yawanarajah, The New England Journal of Public Policy, May 2019.
  "Ancient Hospitality", with John Harris, New Humanist, July 2019.

Broadcast Media
 BBC Radio 4: The Middle East Conundrum, July 2018.
  BBC Radio 4: Across the Red Line (series 1–4), 2018 and 2019 
 BBC Radio 3: Being Diplomatic, April 2019.

References

External links 
Oxford Research Group
Herbert C. Kelman Institute for Interactive Conflict Transformation

1953 births
Alumni of the University of Edinburgh
Alumni of the University of Manchester
Gabrielle Rifkind
British anti-war activists
British Jews
British journalists
British non-fiction writers
British social workers
Social workers
Creative arts therapies
Group psychotherapists
British psychotherapists
Living people
Mediation
Nonviolence advocates
Peace and conflict scholars